A list of music festivals around the world. A music festival is a festival oriented towards music that is sometimes presented with a theme such as musical genre, nationality or locality of musicians, or holiday. They are commonly held outdoors, and are often inclusive of other attractions such as food and merchandise vending, performance art, and social activities. The Pythian Games at Delphi included musical performances, and may be one of the earliest festivals known. During the Middle Ages festivals were often held as competitions.

Related lists and categories

Lists by type

The following is a list of music festival lists by genre or type:

Categories by region
Category:Music festivals by continent
Category:Music festivals by country

Categories by type

Festivals by region

Africa

Angola
 Luanda International Jazz Festival, Luanda (2009–present) Jazz

Democratic Republic of the Congo
 Zaire 74, Kinshasa (1974)

Egypt
 Cairo Congress of Arab Music, Cairo (1932)

Mali
 Festival au Désert (2001–2012)

Malawi
 Lake of Stars Music Festival, Lake Malawi (2004–present)

Morocco

Namibia
 Windhoek Jazz Festival, Windhoek

Nigeria

South Africa
* Ebubeleni Festival, Nelson Mandela Bay (2012–present)

Tanzania
 Sauti za Busara, Zanzibar

Tunisia

Uganda
 Milege Festival, Entebbe (2010–present)
 Pearl Rhythm Festival, Kampala (2012–present)

Asia
 ABU Radio Song Festival
 ABU TV Song Festival

China

Hong Kong
 Clockenflap, Hong Kong

India

Indonesia

Israel

Japan

Lebanon
 Beirut Nights, Beirut

Malaysia
 Future Music Festival Asia, Kuala Lumpur
 Rainforest World Music Festival, Kuching

Nepal
 Fête de la Musique, Kathmandu
 Himalayan Blues Festival, Kathmandu
 Jazzmandu, Kathmandu

Philippines

Singapore

Sri Lanka
 Fête de la Musique, Sri Lanka
 SAGA, Sri Lanka

South Korea

Taiwan

 Amis Music Festival, Taitung County
 Beigang International Music Festival, Beigang
 Hohaiyan Rock Festival, Gongliao
 Spring Scream, Kenting
 Taroko Music Festival, Hualien County

United Arab Emirates
 Dubai Desert Rock Festival, Dubai

Vietnam
 Coca-Cola SoundFest, Ho Chi Minh City

Europe
 Eurovision Song Contest
 Junior Eurovision Song Contest
 Türkvizyon Song Contest
 Tuborg GreenFest

Austria

Belgium

Bulgaria

Croatia

Cyprus
Reggae Sunjam, Cyprus

Czech Republic

Denmark

Estonia

Finland

France

Germany

Greece

Hungary

Iceland

Ireland

Italy

Latvia

Lithuania
 Kaziuko mugė, Vilnius
 Kilkim Žaibu, Varniai
 Tundra, Zarasai

Luxembourg

Macedonia

Malta

Montenegro

Netherlands

Norway

Poland

Portugal

Romania

Russia

Serbia

Slovakia

Slovenia

Spain

Sweden

Switzerland

Turkey

Ukraine

United Kingdom

North America

Canada

Dominican Republic
 Festival Presidente de la Musica Latina, Santo Domingo

Haiti
 Port-au-Prince International Jazz Festival

Mexico

United States

Oceania

Australia

New Zealand

South America

Argentina

Bolivia
 Bach Festival, Cochabamba

Brazil

Chile

Colombia

Ecuador
 Quito Fest, Quito

See also

 List of festivals
 Lists of festivals – festival list articles on Wikipedia

References

External links

 SoundAndScene.com – The most extensive music festival listings (worldwide)

Music